Lake Rosseau/Cameron Bay Water Aerodrome, formerly , was located  south  of Rosseau, Ontario, Canada.

See also
 Windermere Airport
 Lake Rosseau/Arthurlie Bay Water Aerodrome
 Lake Rosseau/Morgan Bay Water Aerodrome
 Lake Rosseau/Windermere Water Aerodrome

References

Defunct seaplane bases in Ontario